The Office of Elementary and Secondary Education is a division of the United States Department of Education. Its purpose is to promote academic excellence, enhance educational opportunities and equity for all of America's children and families, and to improve the quality of teaching and learning by providing leadership, technical assistance, and financial things.

Responsibilities 

The Office is responsible for directing, coordinating, and recommending policy for programs designed to:

 Assist State and local educational agencies to improve the achievement of elementary and secondary school students.
 Help ensure equal access to services leading to such improvement for all children, particularly children who are educationally disadvantaged, Native American, children of migrant workers, or homeless.
 Foster educational improvement at the State and local levels.
 Provide financial assistance to local educational agencies whose local revenues are affected by Federal activities.

Organization 
The Office of Elementary and Secondary Education is under the supervision of the Assistant Secretary for Elementary and Secondary Education, who reports to the Secretary and Deputy Secretary. The Assistant Secretary for Elementary and Secondary Education serves as principal adviser to the Secretary of Education on all matters related to elementary and secondary education.

The current Assistant Secretary is Frank Brogan, who has been serving since his Senate confirmation on June 25, 2018. Previous office holders include: Ann Whalen (2015–2017), Deborah Delisle (2012–2015), and Thelma Melendez (2009–2011).

The Office includes 6 Departments:

 Student Achievement and School Accountability Programs
 Office of Migrant Education
 Impact Aid Programs
 Office of Indian Education
 School Support and Technology Programs
 Academic Improvement and Teacher Quality Programs

See also
 Title 34 of the Code of Federal Regulations

References
Office of Elementary and Secondary Education, US Department of Education, ed.gov

Elementary and Secondary Education, Office of